In the English and British tradition, the royal prerogative of mercy is one of the historic royal prerogatives of the British monarch, by which they can grant pardons (informally known as a royal pardon) to convicted persons. The royal prerogative of mercy was originally used to permit the monarch to withdraw, or provide alternatives to death sentences; the alternative of penal transportation to "partes abroade" was used since at least 1617. It is now used to change any sentence or penalty. A royal pardon does not overturn a conviction.

Officially, this is a power of the monarch. Formally, in Commonwealth realms, this has been delegated to the governor-general of the realm, which in practice means to government ministers who advise the monarch or viceroy, usually those responsible for justice. Specifically, it has been delegated to the Lord Chancellor in England and Wales, the Scottish Ministers in Scotland, and the federal and provincial cabinets in Canada, in respect of federal and provincial offences.

In the important case of Derek Bentley, a court found that this royal prerogative power is "probably" entirely a matter of policy, and thus not justiciable.

Examples in Britain 
In 1717, King George I's Proclamation for Suppressing of Pirates was issued, promising a general pardon to those pirates who surrendered to the authorities.

In 2001 two inmates at HMP Prescoed, South Wales, received early release under the prerogative of mercy as a reward for saving the life of the manager of the prison farm when he was attacked and gored by a captive wild boar.

In 2013 a posthumous pardon was awarded to Alan Turing under the prerogative of mercy. Wartime codebreaker Turing had been convicted in 1952 of gross indecency for a consensual homosexual relationship with an adult.

In 2020, the royal prerogative of mercy was used to reduce the minimum tariff that must be served before Steven Gallant could be considered for release on parole. Gallant, who was serving life imprisonment for murder, was granted this reduction in sentence "in recognition of his exceptionally brave actions at Fishmongers' Hall, which helped save people's lives despite the tremendous risk to his own" while confronting terrorist Usman Khan during the 2019 London Bridge attack.

Other Commonwealth countries

Australia
In Australia, the Governor-General acts on the advice of the Attorney-General or Minister for Justice, and may only exercise the prerogative of mercy in relation to a federal offender convicted of a Commonwealth offence. The pardon may be a full pardon (said to be a free, absolute and unconditional pardon), a conditional pardon, a remission or partial remission of a penalty, or the ordering of an inquiry. Each state and territory (apart from the Australian Capital Territory, which only provides for an inquiry) has also enacted legislation providing for the reconsideration of convictions or sentences.

Canada
In Canada the royal prerogative of mercy is established in Letters Patent of the Governor General, who consistent with constitutional convention may grant pardons on the advice of a cabinet minister. In practice, Section 748 of the Criminal Code gives the Governor in Council (i.e. cabinet) the power to exercise the prerogative, which is the preferred approach.  The process is administered by the Parole Board of Canada. As Canada has a record suspension process, the royal prerogative is only exercised cases where there is substantial injustice or undue hardship. It is rarely granted: between fiscal years 2013-2014 and 2017-2018 there were only 2 requests for clemency under the prerogative granted, compared to over 9,000 record suspensions or pardons granted under legislative powers in fiscal year 2017-2018 alone.

New Zealand
In New Zealand, the prerogative of mercy is exercised by the Governor-General, as the King's representative, with the power being delegated by the Letters Patent 1983. The Governor-General will act on the advice of the Minister of Justice, and has the power to grant a pardon, refer a case back to the courts for reconsideration, and to reduce a person's sentence.

In 2013, Scott Watson was refused a pardon by Sir Jerry Mateparae under the prerogative of mercy, following advice from the then-Minister of Justice Judith Collins. Kristy McDonald QC was appointed by the government in 2009 to review the evidence, and recommended to the government that there was a lack of new evidence to warrant an exercise of the prerogative of mercy.

In 2020 Andrew Little set up the Criminal Review Commission to review potential miscarriage of justices, as the threshold for the royal prerogative of mercy was deemed to be too high and other avenues to avoid miscarriages of justices were needed. Also in 2020, David Tamihere was granted the prerogative of mercy and his case was referred to the Court of Appeals to be reheard.

Malaysia 
In Malaysia, the Yang di-Pertuan Agong has executive power to grant royal pardons. A high profile example is the pardon of politician Anwar Ibrahim, who had been jailed for sodomy, by Muhammad V of Kelantan after the 2018 Malaysian general election.

References

Pardons
Mercy, Prerogative Of